Salehurst Halt was a halt station on the Kent and East Sussex Railway which served the village of Salehurst in East Sussex, England. The station was reached by a footpath leading south from the village church in Salehurst.

History 
Although only officially opened to the public in 1929, a simple platform had existed at Salehurst Halt since at least 1903. It had been provided by the Rother Valley Railway following a request in December 1902 by the vicar of Salehurst, the Reverend Edward Sing, for trains to stop in bad weather on Wednesdays and Sundays so that his organist, Miss Elsam, could arrive at the church in time for services. The organist lived close to Bodiam station and usually reached the church by car, although her journey became difficult during bad weather when the roads were slippery. The vicar contended that as a platform had been provided at Junction Road where trains could be flagged down, a similar facility should be provided at Salehurst which had a higher population. The site of the proposed stopping place was situated to the north of the Rother and was the location of Salehurst Siding which provided goods facilities only. This short siding had been provided for the benefit of the Bantony Estate.

A simple earth and gravel platform held in by a wooden retaining face was duly provided and Colonel Stephens informed the Board of Trade of its existence in July 1903. In October 1913, the Salehurst Parish Council contacted Colonel Stephens about the possibility of establishing a public halt near the church. Although Stephens might have been favourable to the suggestion, nothing happened until 1929. In August 1929, the unexpected announcement was made that construction of a request stop at Salehurst had begun. Rather like Junction Road Halt, the station was no more than a single platform with a wooden bench and nameboard. The station, which began to appear in public timetables from 1929, seems to have been little used, even though it was one of the few stations on the line which was located close to the village it claimed to serve. It was also the only intermediate station not to be situated by a road crossing; it was reached by a footpath leading south from the church. The nearby small village of Salehurst consisted at the time of little more than a church, a public house and a cluster of houses, while Robertsbridge could be reached on foot in less than half an hour which was probably quicker than the usual late-running trains.

Following nationalisation and the creation of British Railways, Salehurst Halt was considered for closure on the basis that it was "never used" according to W. H. Austen, Colonel Stephens' successor.
The halt remained nevertheless open, much in its original state of construction, until the formal withdrawal of passenger services on Saturday 2 January 1954 Soon after public closure, the platform was removed by British Railways. The final passenger train to traverse the section of the line through Salehurst was a Locomotive Club of Great Britain special hauled by LB&SCR A1 class Nos. 32662 and 32670 on 11 June 1961.

Present day 
Nothing remains of the platform, although the station site is still reachable by footpath from Salehurst church. The public house still exists and is now known as "Salehurst Halt".

Notes

Sources

 

Disused railway stations in East Sussex
Former Kent and East Sussex Railway stations
Railway stations in Great Britain opened in 1929
Railway stations in Great Britain closed in 1954
Rother District